Nadia Sibirskaïa (born Germaine Marie Josèphe Lebas, 11 September 1901 – 14 July 1980) was a French film actress. She was married to the Russian-born director Dimitri Kirsanoff and appeared in several of his early films.

Filmography

References

Bibliography 
 Aaron Sultanik. Film, a Modern Art. Associated University Presses, 1986.

External links 
 

1901 births
1980 deaths
French film actresses
French silent film actresses
20th-century French actresses
People from Redon, Ille-et-Vilaine